Rhyzodiastes quadristriatus is a species of ground beetle in the subfamily Rhysodinae. It was described by Louis Alexandre Auguste Chevrolat in 1873. It is known from French Guiana.

References

Rhyzodiastes
Beetles of South America
Beetles described in 1873
Taxa named by Louis Alexandre Auguste Chevrolat